Mount Grenville is the highest summit of the Homathko Icefield of the Pacific Ranges of the Coast Mountains, east of the head of Bute Inlet. It is located at the southern edge of the icefield and is one of a large group of summits in this region to be named for figures of the Elizabethan era, or with other Elizabethan associations (e.g. the icefield includes Armada Peak and Galleon Peak).

References

External links

Aerial photo of northwest face of Mt. Grenviille PBase

Grenville
Grenville
Range 1 Coast Land District